Ebenezer Lutheran Chapel is a historic Lutheran chapel located in Columbia, South Carolina. It was built in 1830, and rebuilt in 1870, while the restoration took place in 1993 and is a brick church that was extensively renovated in 1900. The front façade features two square towers and finely detailed art glass windows.  Adjacent to the church is a Lutheran cemetery which dates to the early 1800s.

It was added to the National Register of Historic Places in 1979.

References

Lutheran churches in South Carolina
Properties of religious function on the National Register of Historic Places in South Carolina
Churches completed in 1800
19th-century Lutheran churches in the United States
Churches in Columbia, South Carolina
National Register of Historic Places in Columbia, South Carolina